The renal sinus is a cavity within the kidney which is occupied by the renal pelvis, renal calyces, blood vessels, nerves and fat. The renal hilum extends into a large cavity within the kidney occupied by the renal vessels, minor renal calyces, major renal calyces, renal pelvis and some adipose tissue.

Additional Images

References

Kidney anatomy